OpenDDS may refer to:

 ICL VME
 OpenDDS, an open-source implementation of Data Distribution Service